Romanesque Revival, Norman Revival or Neo-Norman styles of building in the United Kingdom were inspired by the Romanesque architecture of the 11th and 12th centuries AD.

In the United Kingdom it started to appear as an architectural style in the 18th. century but reached its greatest popularity in the mid to latter years of the 19th. century. The style can be viewed as a strand of Gothic Revival architecture and part of the Historicist or Historismus styles of architecture that became popular in both Europe and Britain during the 19th. century. Early examples of the style in Germany of the 1820s and 1830s are referred to as Rundbogenstil or round arched style. In Britain the style was introduced by architects and their patrons, who had been on tours in Europe and it appears that the German and British styles of Romanesque developed largely independently. Initially in Britain the style was used for church building, but as the 19th. century progressed it was adapted for public buildings, museums, schools and commercial buildings, but rarely for domestic buildings. By the start of the 20th. century it had gone out of fashion and only occasionally were examples of the style built.

Origins 

 
The development of the Norman revival style or Neo-Norman took place over a long time in the British Isles starting with Inigo Jones‘s re-fenestration of the White Tower of the Tower of London in 1637–38 and work at Windsor Castle by Hugh May for Charles II, but this was little more than restoration work. More surprising is the west door of Kenilworth Church, inserted in the tower in 1570 probably at the time of a visit of Queen Elizabeth. This appears to have been historic arch, sourced possibly from an unknown monastic building, Another early example of Romanesque revival is the south porch of North Scarle Church in Lincolnshire. Pevsner suggests that it might be Elizabethan, but late 17th. century seems more likely as the oak door seems to be original and probably of that date.

In the 18th century the use of round arched windows was thought of as being Saxon rather than Norman and examples of buildings with round arched windows include Shirburn Castle in Oxfordshire, Wentworth in Yorkshire and Enmore Castle in Somerset. At Allerton Mauleverer in Yorkshire St Martin’s Church was re-built for Richard Arundell in 1745. The church has been described as a proto-Neo-Norman. While it gives the impression of a Romanesque revival church, with a massive crossing tower and round headed windows, yet it also has windows with gothic tracery and a hammerbeam nave roof. The architect is thought to have been John Vardy surveyor to the Office of Works.

A further example of church building in the Romanesque revival style took place in 1792 when Elisa Wingfield commissioned plans from Samuel Pepys Cockerell for the conservation and rebuilding of St Peter's Church, Tickencote in Rutland. The church which contained much notable Romanesque decoration and an elaborate chancel arch appears to have been close to collapse. Cockerell encased the chancel, keeping the arch in position but the outer walls were completely re-built and the exterior ornamentation of arcades and round headed windows were replaced in new stonework. A new tower over a porch was built on the south side, which gave added stability to the older structure. The nave was completely re-built using some new romanesque mot is and copying others, such as the engaged columns, from those on the exterior of the chancel. This style of Romanesque revival architecture is very similar to the style that emerges in the 1840s under architectects such as Thomas Penson and Benjamin Ferrey. Tickencote could be considered to mark the start of the Romanesque revival in church architecture.

In Scotland the style started to emerge with the Duke of Argyll’s castle at Inverary, started in 1744, and castles by Robert Adam at Culzean (1771), Oxenfoord (1780–2), Dalquharran (1782–5), and Seton Palace (1792). In England James Wyatt used round arched windows at Sandleford Priory, Berkshire in 1780–79 and the Duke of Norfolk started to rebuild Arundel Castle, while Eastnor Castle in Herefordshire was built by Robert Smirke between 1812 and 1820. 

 
At Eastnor Smirke combines a rugged Romanesque with more subtle Gothic window tracery.
The elements of Eastnor are further developed about 1840 at Devizes Castle, where the Bath architect Henry Goodridge combines the Castellated gothic style of Eastnor with a Romanesque entrance arch and Romanesque windows.

Development of archaeologically correct Romanesque
 

It was at this point that the Norman Revival became a recognisable architectural style. In 1817 Thomas Rickman published his An Attempt to Discriminate the Styles of English Architecture from the Conquest to the Reformation. It was now realised that round-arch architecture was largely Romanesque in the British Isles and came to be described as Norman rather than Saxon. This distinction was finally recognised when Rickman’s article in Archaeologia (1832–33), was published by the Society of Antiquaries. The start of an archaeologically correct Norman Revival can be recognised in the architecture of Thomas Hopper. His first attempt at this style was at Gosford Castle in Armagh in Ireland, but far more successful was his Penrhyn Castle near Bangor in North Wales. This was built for the Pennant family, between 1820 and 1837. 

An example of Romanesque revival architecture being used for follies in 1832 was by George Proctor at  Benington Lordship in Hertfordshire.  Proctor added a neo-Norman gatehouse, summerhouse and curtain wall to the site of a Motte-and-bailey castle. The arches and decorative features  to the gatehouse and summerhouse were in Pulhamite, a form of Cast stone that was manufactured by James Pulham and Son.    
 
The Neo-Norman style did not catch on for domestic buildings, though many country houses and mock castles were built in the Castle Gothic or Castellated style during the Victorian period, which were mixed Gothic styles.

Church architecture and the Romanesque Revival

However, the Norman Revival did catch on for church architecture. It was Thomas Penson, a Welsh architect, who would have been familiar with Hopper’s work at Penrhyn, who developed Romanesque Revival church architecture. Penson was influenced by French and Belgian Romanesque architecture, and particularly the earlier Romanesque phase of German Brick Gothic. At St David’s Newtown, 1843–47 and St Agatha’s Llanymynech, 1845, he copies the tower of St. Salvator's Cathedral, Bruges. Other examples of Romanesque revival by Penson are Christ Church, Welshpool, 1839–1844, and the porch to Langedwyn Church. He was an innovator in the use of terracotta to produce decorative Romanesque mouldings, saving on the expense of stonework. Penson’s last church in the Romanesque Revival style was Rhosllannerchrugog, Wrexham of 1852

Sara Losh and Wreay Church
A most remarkable example of Romanesque church building was St Mary’s Church at Wreay, near Carlisle. This was designed by Sara Losh and built between 1841 and 1842. Losh had travelled widely on the Continent and particularly in Italy and drew inspiration from Romanesque sources. Losh is known to have read Thomas Hope's Historical Study of Architecture (1815), which uses the term Lombardic for the style brought into Italy from the early Christian churches of Constantinople, and she described St Mary's as being an unpolished mode of building that most approximates to early Saxon or modified Lombard This statement suggests that at the time of its design Losh was not aware of Thomas Rickman’s re-classification of Saxon and Norman architecture. While the appearance and layout of the church may be considered as Romanesque, her free interpretation of the decoration on the woodwork and the arched stone windows and doors is anticipating the styles of the Arts and Crafts movement, while the arcading of the apse certainly has a Byzantine feel to it.

Sarah Losh gallery

Other Early Victorian architects working in the Romanesque revival style
The early years of the 1840s saw a considerable upsurge of interest in the developing Romanesque revival style by some of the leading architects of the period. During the 19th century the architecture selected for Anglican churches depended on the churchmanship of particular congregations. Whereas high churches and Anglo-Catholic, which were influenced by the Oxford Movement, were built in Gothic Revival architecture; low churches and Broad churches of the period were often built in the Romanesque Revival style. The architects specialising in Romanesque revival took their designs from different local styles of the European Romanesque.

Edmund Sharpe
Another architect who popularised the Romanesque revival style was Edmund Sharpe, who set up his practice at Lancaster in 1835. At Cambridge he had been a great friend of William Whewell and presumably of the polymath and architectural historian Professor Robert Willis. He was awarded a travelling scholarship to study the early architecture of Germany and Southern France and supplied Thomas Rickman with information. However, Sharpe despite being an architectural historian of some note, built churches that were much freer interpretations of the Romanesque and German Brick Gothic and might be considered less archaeologically correct.

Four of Sharpe's earliest churches – St Saviour, Bamber Bridge (1836–37); St Mark, Witton (1836–38); and St Paul, Farington, near Leyland (1839–40) – were in the Romanesque style, which he chose because no style can be worked so cheap as the Romanesque. They turned out to be little more than rectangular 'preaching boxes'… with no frills and little ornamentation; and many of them were later enlarged. The only subsequent churches in which Sharpe used Romanesque elements St Mary's Church, Conistone in Wharfedale (1846); and St Paul, Scotforth in south Lancaster (1874–6). Sharpe's final essay in the Romanesque Revival style St Paul's Church, Scotforth, was described by Nikolaus Pevsner as a strange building and an anachronism, almost beyond belief. Sharpe had retired from his architectural practice in 1851. He then pursued a career in railway engineering. In 1874, when he was aged 68, he returned to architecture and designed this church which was opened in 1876. The church had used terracotta in a similar fashion to his earliest churches and it can only be assumed that its anachronistic appearance was that he had used a design that he had prepared at least 20 years earlier.

Romanesque by Sharpe

Benjamin Ferrey

 The work of Benjamin Ferrey can be considered to be similar to that of Thomas Penson, based on the English and French Romanesque traditions. An early example is his church of St Nicholas at East Grafton in Wiltshire, built in 1842–44. Here the chancel terminates in an apse and the west has overlapping arcading and chevron decoration over the entrance door. Central crossing tower and arcaded windows on the west frontis approached through a stone Romanesque Lych gate.

A more important work by Ferrey is the Church of St James the Great at Morpeth, Northumberland. The church, which is supposed to be modelled on the cathedral of Monreale in Sicily, was built between 1844 and 1846. The unusual arched gate is acceptably Sicilian in inspiration and is similar to the portico at the cathedral at Monreale, but the rest of the composition has much more in common with French and Belgian Romanesque. A further church in this style is Christ Church in Melplash in Dorset of 1845–46. This has a heavy crossing tower and in many respects resembles the Church of St. James the Great at Morpeth.

Romanesque by Ferrey

William Perkin of Leeds
St Michael and All Angels Barton le Street, North Yorkshire.
This church was very extensively rebuilt in 1869–71 by William Perkin and his sons of Leeds. Unlike Tickencote there is no record of the church that was replaced. The building contains an extensive and impressive range of genuine romanesque, but these seem to have been largely repositioned. The pews and some other furnishings are in Romanesque revival style. The rebuilding was financed by Hugo Francis Meynell-Ingram.

Barton le Street Gallery

Romanesque gallery

Chapel architecture

In the 1860s, Romanesque architecture became a popular style of architecture for Dissenting chapels. Possibly this was intended to give the impression that they were churches similar to Anglican churches and they are often referred to as churches rather than chapels. This form of architecture was often chosen by the Baptists. This architecture is an adapted and debased form of Italianate Romanesque as seen at the Potter's Bar Old Baptist Church in Hertfordshire in 1859. The Baptist Church in Brown Street Salisbury of the 1880s is similar in bright red brick and was built in the 1880s. It is noticeably more archaeologically correct in its use of arched windows and the entrance door. A Baptist Chapel of 1870 by the Lincoln architects Drury and Mortimer, the Mint Lane Baptist Chapel in Lincoln is in a debased Italianate Romanesque revival style but has a surprising tower in the castellated Gothic style.

Synagogues
The Romanesque revival was also a style of architecture that appealed to Jewish communities and there are examples of Synagogues in this style. 
One of these is the synagogue built adjacent to the docks at Grimsby in Lincolnshire.

Later Romanesque Revival churches in Scotland

 
The earliest example of Romanesque revival architecture in Scotland is the West Kirk, Sandgate, Ayr. By the architect William Gale for the Presbyterian Free Church and built in 1844–45. The columns used for the windows are very similar to those used by Edmund Sharpe at Scotford church.
In Scotland the Presbyterians occasionally built in the Romanesque revival style, but only later in the 19th century. 
St Conan’s Kirk Lochawe, Agyll and Bute is an extraordinary early 20th century church on the shore of Loch Awe, built by Walter Douglas Campbell, brother of the 1st Lord Blythswood, was started in 1881, but not completed until 1930. The kirk is largely Romanesque in style, but is also mixed with other completely unrelated styles. Another church is Cranshaws in Berwickshire. Here the 1739 church was rebuilt in 1899 by architect George Fortune in Romanesque Revival style.

Sir Alfred Waterhouse and developed Romanesque Architecture

Interest in Romanesque Revival Architecture was renewed by Sir Alfred Waterhouse's Natural History Museum in Kensington, which was built between 1873 and 1881. It was built in shades of buff coloured terracotta and opened the way for the Romanesque style to be used for other buildings, apart from churches. Waterhouse tended to mix the architectural styles, often using decorative Romanesque arches to provide impressive entrances for his buildings, and popularised the deep red terracotta produced by manufacturer's in the Wrexham and Ruabon area of North-East Wales. This included parts of the Prudential Insurance building in London and the entrance to Strangeways Prison.

Buildings by Waterhouse

Later 19th and 20th century

Waterhouse inspired other architects to build using terracotta and this material was used by William Watkins, a Lincoln architect who very successfully used a deep red Ruabon terracotta for the Lincoln Christ's Hospital Girls School of 1893. An earlier building by Watkins of 1873, was originally built as a warehouse at 42 Silver Street, Lincoln. This uses artificial stone for Romanesque columns and arches to embellish the frontage.

St Aidan's Church, Leeds

St Aidan's Church, Leeds is a massive basilica church built in the tradition of Waterhouse, using red terracotta brickwork. The design was won by competition in 1889 and the church was built between 1891 and 1894 by the Newcastle architects RJ Johnson and A Crawford Hick. The style is a hybrid of Italian, French and German Romanesque and the Corbel table or moulded stringcourse below the eaves was based on that of Lund Cathedral in Sweden. The inside is sumptuously decorated with mosaic decoration by Sir Frank Brangwyn in the apse and a multi-coloured marble font with Romanesque arcading. The interior columns of the basilica have ornamental capitals in the Byzantine style.

20th century

In the 20th.century the use of the Romanesque revival style in church architecture appears to be restricted to brick built churches and often these churches have similarities with churches built in the Byzantine revival style, which became more popular in the early years of the 20th century. 
Churches in the Romanesque revival style include All Saints, Bute Avenue, Petersham, Richmond-upon-Thames. This Romanesque revival church was designed by J Kelly and completed in 1908.

An even later example of the style is St Francis, Linden Road, Bournville, consecrated in 1925. This church was designed by Harvey and Wicks, the architects of the Bournville Estate

References

Sources and further reading

External links

 
Architectural history
British architectural styles
Edwardian architecture
Revival architectural styles
Victorian architectural styles